Tim Hall (born 15 April 1997) is a Luxembourger international footballer who plays as a centre-back for Hungarian club Újpest.

Career
Hall played club football for Lierse S.K., and previously featured for the youth sides of 1. FC Saarbrücken and SV Elversberg. On 10 August 2020 he became a new Gil Vicente player. On 14 January 2021, he joined the Polish Ekstraklasa side Wisła Kraków, but his contract was terminated just eleven days later.

He made his international debut for Luxembourg in 2017 in a friendly against Cape Verde.

References

1997 births
Sportspeople from Esch-sur-Alzette
Living people
Luxembourgian footballers
Luxembourg youth international footballers
Luxembourg under-21 international footballers
Luxembourg international footballers
Association football defenders
Lierse S.K. players
FC Progrès Niederkorn players
FC Karpaty Lviv players
Gil Vicente F.C. players
Wisła Kraków players
Ethnikos Achna FC players
Újpest FC players
Regionalliga players
Challenger Pro League players
Luxembourg National Division players
Ukrainian Premier League players
Primeira Liga players
Cypriot First Division players
Nemzeti Bajnokság I players
Luxembourgian expatriate footballers
Expatriate footballers in Belgium
Luxembourgian expatriate sportspeople in Belgium
Expatriate footballers in Germany
Luxembourgian expatriate sportspeople in Germany
Expatriate footballers in Ukraine
Luxembourgian expatriate sportspeople in Ukraine
Expatriate footballers in Portugal
Luxembourgian expatriate sportspeople in Portugal
Expatriate footballers in Poland
Luxembourgian expatriate sportspeople in Poland
Expatriate footballers in Cyprus
Luxembourgian expatriate sportspeople in Cyprus
Expatriate footballers in Hungary
Luxembourgian expatriate sportspeople in Hungary